Ruan Pereira Duarte (born 3 May 2005), simply known as Ruan, is a Brazilian footballer who plays as a forward for Juventude.

Club career
Born in Caxias do Sul, Rio Grande do Sul, Ruan joined Juventude's youth setup in 2016, aged eleven. On 5 August 2022, he signed his first professional contract with the club, for three years.

Ruan made his first team – and Série A – debut on 3 September 2022, coming on as a late substitute for Óscar Ruiz in a 1–1 home draw against Avaí.

Career statistics

References

External links
Juventude profile 

2005 births
Living people
People from Caxias do Sul
Sportspeople from Rio Grande do Sul
Brazilian footballers
Association football forwards
Campeonato Brasileiro Série A players
Esporte Clube Juventude players